Lao River may refer to:

Lao (Italian river), a river in Italy
Lao River (Thailand), a tributary of the Kok River in Thailand

See also 
 Lao (disambiguation)